Ayesha is a genus of cicadas in the family Cicadidae. There is only one described species, Ayesha serva.

References

Further reading
 

Dundubiini